Business Buzz: Startups Unlimited (తెలుగు: బిజినెస్ బజ్: స్టార్టప్స్ అన్-లిమిటెడ్) is a television reality show, created by B. Venkateshwarlu to support aspirants to become entrepreneurs. The Business Buzz television reality show is produced by Kushmanv Web Technologies Private Limited and broadcasting in TV5 News from May 8, 2016 on every Sunday's.

Business Buzz: Startups Unlimited is India's very first reality television show for and about young entrepreneurs. Business Buzz is a televised contest that combines the high drama and popularity of Reality TV with educational content to create "edutainment".

Synopsis
Business Buzz Television reality show is designed to help an individual in strengthening his entrepreneurial motive and in acquiring skills and capabilities necessary for playing his entrepreneurial role effectively. It is necessary to promote this understanding of motives and their impact on entrepreneurial values and behavior for this purpose.

Expert Committee
The six member expert committee/panel will discuss the entrepreneurship opportunities on various subjects with participants who may business persons, aspirants, start-up company delegates, looking support from bankers / investors or business support from expert organizations etc. The show also has a small business game with the participants & speakers.

Participants
Bankers, government officials, NGOs, industrial chambers representatives, aspiring entrepreneurs and investors are the key participants at Business Buzz television reality show.

External links
 Official Site
 Kushmanv Web Technologies
 You Tube
 TV5 News

2015 Indian television series debuts
Indian reality television series